Vasilios Mavrapostolos (25 April 1916 – 1995) was a Greek long-distance runner. He competed in the men's 5000 metres at the 1948 Summer Olympics.

References

External links
 

1916 births
1995 deaths
Athletes (track and field) at the 1948 Summer Olympics
Greek male long-distance runners
Greek male steeplechase runners
Olympic athletes of Greece
Place of birth missing
20th-century Greek people